Bernard Crouch (1925–1955), was a male international table tennis player from England.

Table tennis career
Crouch won a bronze medal at the 1950 World Table Tennis Championships in the Swaythling Cup (men's team) event with Richard Bergmann, Johnny Leach, Aubrey Simons and Harry Venner for England.

He won the Wilmott Cup for the Staines League in 1954/55 and was also on the Middlesex County Championships winning side in 1947–48 and 1949–50 to 1955.

Tennis
He was an excellent tennis player and a regular member of the Surrey County side and played at Wimbledon on several occasions.

Death
He died in the 1955 Barnes railway accident.

See also
 List of England players at the World Team Table Tennis Championships
 List of World Table Tennis Championships medalists

References

English male table tennis players
1925 births
1955 deaths
World Table Tennis Championships medalists
English male tennis players
British male tennis players